Dave Van Ronk, Folksinger is a studio album by American folksinger Dave Van Ronk, released in November 1962 on the Prestige International label.

History
Folksinger (Prestige International PR- INT 13056 [1962] reissued as Prestige Folklore FL 14012 [1963]) was recorded in April 1962. Inside Dave Van Ronk (Prestige Folklore FL 14025) would combine with it and all end up on the Fantasy Records 1989 CD release, Inside Dave Van Ronk. That combination was released as a double LP set in 1972 as Van Ronk (not the 1969 album of the same name). Songs from Folksinger along with selections from Inside Dave Van Ronk and In the Tradition were also released on the Big Beat label in the compilation Hesitation Blues.

Reception

Allmusic gave it a 5 of 5 stars in their review and stated "This is a vital touchstone of Americana and likewise is highly recommended as a key component of any serious collection of 20th century folk music." It is the only Van Ronk album to have received 5/5 stars from Allmusic.

Track listing
 "Samson and Delilah" - 3:35
 "Cocaine Blues" - 4:13
 "You've Been a Good Old Wagon" - 2:16
 "Fixin' to Die" - 2:50
 "Hang Me, Oh Hang Me" - 3:07
 "Long John" - 2:10
 "Chicken is Nice" - 2:29
 "He Was a Friend of Mine" - 3:29
 "Motherless Children" - 3:45
 "Stackerlee" - 3:32
 "Mr. Noah" - 1:28
 "Come Back, Baby" - 3:48
 "Poor Lazarus" - 5:06

Personnel
Dave Van Ronk - guitar, vocals

Production notes
Engineered by Rudy Van Gelder

References

1962 albums
Dave Van Ronk albums
Prestige Records albums